Thomas Lahiff (born 1995) is an Irish Gaelic footballer who plays for Dublin SFC club St Jude's and at inter-county level with the Dublin senior football team. He usually lines out as a defender.

Career

Lahiff first came to sporting prominence playing soccer. He played at under-19 level with Bray Wanderers before making it onto the first team squad, however, the leap to becoming a full-time professional in Britain remained unfulfilled. Lahiff joined the St Jude's in 2014 and has been a mainstay of the senior team since then. He first appeared on the inter-county scene as a member of the Dublin under-21 football team and won a Leinster U21 Championship title in 2016. Lahiff joined the senior team for the 2019 O'Byrne Cup pre-season tournament and was an unused substitute when Dublin beat Mayo in the 2020 All-Ireland final. His other honours include two Leinster Championships and a National League title.

Honours

Dublin
Leinster Senior Football Championship: 2020, 2021
National Football League: 2021
Leinster Under-21 Football Championship: 2016

References

External link
Tom Lahiff profile at the Dublin GAA website

1995 births
Living people
St Jude's Gaelic footballers
Dublin inter-county Gaelic footballers